In mathematics, particularly in the subfield of real analytic geometry, a subanalytic set is a set of points (for example in Euclidean space) defined in a way broader than for semianalytic sets (roughly speaking, those satisfying conditions requiring certain real power series to be positive there). Subanalytic sets still have a reasonable local description in terms of submanifolds.

Formal definitions
A subset V of a given Euclidean space E is  semianalytic if each point has a neighbourhood U in E such that the intersection of V and U lies in the Boolean algebra of sets generated by subsets defined by inequalities f > 0,  where f is a real analytic function. There is no Tarski–Seidenberg theorem for semianalytic sets, and projections of semianalytic sets are in general not semianalytic.

A subset V of E is a subanalytic set if for each point there exists a relatively compact semianalytic set X in a Euclidean space F of dimension at least as great as E, and a neighbourhood U in E, such that the intersection of V and U is a linear projection of X into E from F.

In particular all semianalytic sets are subanalytic. On an open dense subset, subanalytic sets are submanifolds and so they have a definite dimension "at most points". Semianalytic sets are contained in a real-analytic subvariety of the same dimension. However, subanalytic sets are not in general contained in any subvariety of the same dimension. On the other hand, there is a theorem, to the effect that a subanalytic set A can be written as a locally finite union of submanifolds.

Subanalytic sets are not closed under projections, however, because a real-analytic subvariety that is not relatively compact can have a projection which is not a locally finite union of submanifolds, and hence is not subanalytic.

See also
 Semialgebraic set

References
Edward Bierstone and Pierre D. Milman, Semianalytic and subanalytic sets, Inst. Hautes Études Sci. Publ. Math. (1988), no. 67, 5–42.

External links
 Real Algebraic and Analytic Geometry Preprint Server

Real algebraic geometry